Error is the self-titled debut EP by Error, released by Epitaph Records in 2004. It is their only recorded work as of 2021.

Although not an official member, Greg Puciato of the Dillinger Escape Plan was asked to record vocals for the EP, as the band was without a vocalist at the time.

Track listing

Personnel
 Greg Puciato - lead vocals
 Atticus Ross - programming
 Brett Gurewitz - guitar, bass
 Leopold Ross - drums, percussion
 Joey Karam - Moog synthesizer on "Jack the Ripper"

Credits
 Published by Sick Muse Songs
 Administered by EMI Music Publishing
 Design by Nick Pritchard

References

2004 EPs
Error (band) albums
Epitaph Records EPs